Tetragonoderus mexicanus is a species of beetle in the family Carabidae. It was described by Chaudoir in 1876. It can be found in Mexico, Guatemala and Nicaragua.

References

Beetles described in 1876
Taxa named by Maximilien Chaudoir
mexicanus